Ryan Searle (born 21 October 1987) is an English professional darts player who plays in the Professional Darts Corporation (PDC) events.

Career
He reached the last 16 of the 2013 BDO World Masters after a controversial win over Richie George, when his winning dart at double 10 did not actually hit the target, but referee Nick Rolls called 'game shot', ending the leg and giving Searle the match.

In 2016, he finished second on the PDC Challenge Tour Order of Merit, thanks to winning two events along the way, which meant he automatically gained a PDC Tour Card.

In the PDC, Searle reached the fourth round of the World Championship on his debut in 2019, then the third round the following year where he led Gary Anderson 3–1 but was eventually defeated 3–4. The next season, Searle won his first Pro Tour title by beating world number one Michael van Gerwen 8–6 in the final of event 3.

Searle made his first appearance in a PDC major quarter-final at the 2021 World Grand Prix, following victories over Dimitri Van den Bergh and Luke Humphries. He lost to Stephen Bunting in the quarter-finals, by a score of 3–1 in sets.

Personal
Searle has astigmatism. He often cannot even see where his darts land.

World Championship results

PDC
 2019: Fourth round (lost to Michael Smith 1–4)
 2020: Third round (lost to Gary Anderson 3–4)
 2021: Fourth round (lost to Stephen Bunting 3–4)
 2022: Fourth round (lost to Peter Wright 1–4)
 2023: Third round (lost to José de Sousa 3–4)

Performance timeline
BDO

PDC

PDC European Tour

PDC career finals

PDC major finals: 1 (1 runner-up)

References

External links

{{#ifexpr:<21|}}

1987 births
Living people
English darts players
People from Wellington, Somerset
PDC ranking title winners
Professional Darts Corporation current tour card holders